Ertz is a surname. Notable people with this surname include:

 Edward Frederick Ertz (1862-1954), Anglo-American artist
 Julie Ertz (born 1992), American American football player
 Klaus Ertz (born 1945), German art historian
 Susan Ertz (1887–1985), Anglo-American writer
 Zach Ertz (born 1990), American American football player